Tales of the City is the debut studio album by Australian rock band Rockmelons. It was released in May 1988 on True Tone Records and peaked at number six on the Australian album charts. The band shared the Australian Record Industry Association (ARIA) Award for 'Best Debut Album' in 1988 with 1927's album ...ish.

It was re-issued in 1992 by Mushroom Records.

The first single, "Rhymes", was a cover of Al Green's song, from his 1974 album, Al Green Is Love.

Reception
Smash Hits said, "The plucky little Rockmelons finally come across with the goods, delighting their thousands of fans, confounding the doubting thomases, and failing to convert anyone else. You have a remarkably commercial album that's slightly muzak-ish and a little too jazzesque for me, but certainly like nothing else being done in Australia at the moment.

Track listing
All songs written by R. Medhurst, B. Jones, J. Jones, R. Smith except where noted, according to Australasian Performing Right Association (APRA).

 "New Groove" – 4:39 
 "What's It Gonna Be?" – 4:46 
 "Jump" – 2:31 
 "Thief" (R. Medhurst, J. Jones, B. Jones) – 3:21 
 "Dreams in the Empty City" (R. Medhurst, J. Jones, B. Jones) – 3:45 
 "Get Back on the Groove" – 4:56 
 "Rhymes" (A. Green, M. Hodges) – 4:43 
 "Boogietron" (J. Jones, B. Jones) – 4:22 
 "Money Talks" – 3:59

Personnel
Credited to:

Rockmelons
 Raymond Medhurst – keyboards  
 Byron Jones – keyboards, bass guitar, vocals  
 Jonathon Jones – keyboards, guitar, drums
 John Kenny – vocals
 Mary Azzopardi – vocals
 Wendy Matthews – vocals

Recording details
 Producer – Robin Smith
 Engineer – Barry Rudolph

Charts

Weekly charts

Year-end charts

References

1988 debut albums
ARIA Award-winning albums
Rockmelons albums